Eleanor Jean Parker (June 26, 1922 – December 9, 2013) was an American actress. She was nominated for three Academy Awards for her roles in the films Caged (1950), Detective Story (1951), and Interrupted Melody (1955), the first of which won her the Volpi Cup for Best Actress. She was also known for her roles in the films Of Human Bondage (1946), Scaramouche (1952), The Naked Jungle (1954), The Man with the Golden Arm (1955), A Hole in the Head (1959), The Sound of Music (1965), and The Oscar (1966).

Early life 
Eleanor Jean Parker was born on June 26, 1922 in Cedarville, Ohio, the daughter of Lola (née Isett) and Lester Day Parker. She moved with her family to East Cleveland, Ohio, where she attended public schools and graduated from Shaw High School. "Ever since I can remember, all I wanted to do is act", she said. "But I didn't just dream about it. I worked at it."

She appeared in a number of school plays. After graduation, she went to Martha's Vineyard to work on her acting. She got a job as a waitress and was offered a screen test by 20th Century Fox, but turned it down. Wanting to focus on films, she moved to California and started appearing at the Pasadena Playhouse.

Career

Warner Bros
She was in the audience one night at Pasadena Playhouse when spotted by a Warners Bros talent scout, Irving Kumin. He offered her a test, and she accepted; the studio signed her to a long-term contract in June 1941.

She was cast that year in the film They Died with Their Boots On, but her scenes were cut. Her actual film debut was as Nurse Ryan in the short film Soldiers in White in 1942.

She was given some decent roles in the B films Busses Roar (1942) and The Mysterious Doctor (1943), and she had a small role in an Mission to Moscow (1943). This performance impressed Warners, so when Joan Leslie was held up on Rhapsody in Blue, Parker replaced her in Between Two Worlds (1944), playing the suicidal wife of Paul Henreid's character.

She stayed in supporting roles for Crime by Night (1944) and The Last Ride (1944), then was given the starring role with Dennis Morgan in The Very Thought of You (1944), replacing Ida Lupino. She was given a cameo in Hollywood Canteen (1944). Warners gave her the choice role of Mildred Rogers in a new version of Somerset Maugham's Of Human Bondage (1946). Although director Edmund Goulding called Parker one of the five greatest actresses in America, previews were not favorable, and the film sat on the shelf for two years before being released to an underwhelming reception. However, in 1953, Parker called it her favorite role.

Parker later said the "big break" of her career was when she was cast with John Garfield in Pride of the Marines (1945). "It was a great part, and who wouldn't look good with John Garfield", she later said. "He was absolutely wonderful." However, two films that followed with Errol Flynn, the romantic comedy Never Say Goodbye (1946) and the drama Escape Me Never (1947), were box-office disappointments.

Parker was suspended twice by Warners for refusing parts in filmsin Stallion Road (where she was replaced by Alexis Smith) and Love and Learn.

She made the comedy Voice of the Turtle (1947, aired today under the title One for the Book) with Ronald Reagan and was in an adaptation of The Woman in White (1948). She refused to appear in Somewhere in the City (1948) so Warners suspended her again; Virginia Mayo played the role.

Parker then had two years off, and during this time, she married and had a baby. She turned down a role in The Hasty Heart (1949), which she wanted to do, but it would have meant going to England, and she did not want to leave her baby alone during its first year. "I probably received my salary for only six months during 1947 and 1948, but I can't regret that", she said. "All my life, I wanted a child, and anything that might happen to me professionally on that account would hardly seem a loss."

She returned in Chain Lightning with Humphrey Bogart. "I've had my fling at roles that have little or no relation to most people's lives", she said in a 1949 interview. "I want to keep away from such assignments, as I can from now on, even though, as some may say, they mean exercising your skill and talent in acting."

Parker heard about Caged (1950), a film Warners was making of a woman in prison, and she lobbied the role. She got it, and won the 1950 Volpi Cup for Best Actress at the Venice Film Festival and was nominated for an Academy Award. She also had a good role in the melodrama Three Secrets (1950).

In February 1950, Parker left Warner Bros. after having been under contract there for eight years. Parker had understood that she would star in a film called Safe Harbor, but Warner Bros. apparently had no intention of making it. Because of this misunderstanding, her agents negotiated her release.

Paramount
Parker's career outside of Warners started badly with Valentino (1951), where she played a fictionalized wife of Rudolph Valentino, and then she tried the comedy  A Millionaire for Christy (1951) (originally called The Golden Goose).

In 1951, Parker signed a contract with Paramount for one film per year, with an option for outside films. This arrangement began brilliantly with Detective Story (1951) for director William Wyler, playing Mary McLeod, the woman who doesn't understand the position of her unstable detective husband (played by Kirk Douglas); Parker was nominated for the Oscar in 1951 for her performance, which, to date, remains the shortest performance to be nominated in the category.

MGM
Parker followed Detective Story with her portrayal of an actress in love with a swashbuckling nobleman (played by Stewart Granger) in Scaramouche (1952), a role originally intended for Ava Gardner. Parker later claimed that Granger was the only person she didn't get along with during her entire career. However, they had good chemistry, and the film was a massive hit; MGM rushed her into Above and Beyond (1952), a biopic of Lt. Col. Paul W. Tibbets, Jr. (Robert Taylor), the pilot of the aircraft that dropped the atomic bomb on Hiroshima. It was a solid hit. While Parker was making Escape from Fort Bravo (1953), she signed a five-year contract with MGM.

She was named as star of My Most Intimate Friend and of One More Time, from a script by Ruth Gordon and Garson Kanin, but neither film was made. Back at Paramount, Parker starred with Charlton Heston as a 1901 mail-order bride in The Naked Jungle (1954), directed by Byron Haskin and produced by George Pal.

Parker returned to MGM where she was reunited with Robert Taylor in Valley of the Kings (1954), and the Western Many Rivers to Cross (1955).

"I maintain that if you work, believe in yourself, and do what is right for you without stepping all over others, the way somehow opens up", she said in 1953. "By that, I don't mean just sitting back. At Warners, they still have a mile-long list of my suspensions for refusing certain parts. Anyway, I never did a Western. Not once. It's paid off too."

In a 1954 interview, she said her favorite films were Caged and Detective Story and her least favorite were Chain Lightning, Escape Me Never, Valentino, and Woman in White. She had commitments to make two films per year at MGM and one per year at Paramount. "Personally, I prefer to be under contract", she said.

MGM gave her one of her better roles as opera singer Marjorie Lawrence in Interrupted Melody (1955). It was a big hit and earned Parker a third Oscar nomination; she later said it was her favorite film.

Also in 1955, Parker appeared in the film adaptation of the National Book Award-winner The Man with the Golden Arm (1955), directed by Otto Preminger and released through United Artists. She played Zosh, a woman in a wheelchair and the wife of heroin-addicted would-be jazz drummer Frankie Machine (Frank Sinatra). It was a major commercial and critical success.

In 1956, she was billed above the title with Clark Gable for the comedy The King and Four Queens, also for United Artists.

It was then back at MGM for two movies, both dramas: Lizzie (1957), in the title role, as a woman with a split personality; The Seventh Sin (1957), a remake of The Painted Veil. Both films flopped at the box office, and as a result, Parker's plans to produce L'Eternelle, about French resistance fighters, did not materialize.

Later films, and transition into television and theatre
Parker supported Frank Sinatra in the popular comedy A Hole in the Head (1959). She returned to MGM for Home from the Hill (1960), co-starring with Robert Mitchum, then took over Lana Turner's role of Constance Rossi in Return to Peyton Place, a 1961 sequel to the hit 1957 film. It was made by 20th Century Fox which produced Madison Avenue (1961) with Parker.

In 1960, she made her TV debut. "I look for the quality story and for parts that I think will be good or fun. People told me I was crazy to do Hole in the Head and Home from the Hill, but both those pictures appealed to me. I did enough of the bad ones (films), while I was under contract – because I was being told to do them. That's the problem with being under contract. You do the pictures, or be suspended. Now, I don't want to work unless I have faith in the part. This has nothing to do with wanting to be famous, or anything like that. It's just that I love acting."

In the early 1960s, she worked increasingly in television, with the occasional film role such as Panic Button (1964).

Parker's best-known screen role was playing Baroness Elsa Schraeder in the 1965 Oscar-winning musical The Sound of Music.

In 1966, she played an alcoholic widow in the crime drama Warning Shot, a talent scout who discovers a Hollywood star in The Oscar, and a rich alcoholic in An American Dream. From the late 1960s, she focused on television roles.

In 1963, Parker appeared in the medical drama The Eleventh Hour in the episode "Why Am I Grown So Cold?", for which she was nominated for an Emmy Award as Outstanding Single Performance by an Actress in a Leading Role. In 1964, she appeared in the episode "A Land More Cruel" on Breaking Point. In 1968, she portrayed a spy in How to Steal the World, a film originally shown as the two-part concluding episodes of The Man from U.N.C.L.E..

Parker starred with Michael Sarrazin and Gayle Hunnicutt in her final theatrical film of the 1960s, the tense thriller Eye of The Cat (1969), which was written by Joseph Stefano.

In 1969–1970, Parker starred in the television series Bracken's World, for which she was nominated for a 1970 Golden Globe Award as Best TV ActressDrama. "I wanted to do the series so I could stay put", she said. "Every movie I'm offered is shot in Europe or Asia or somewhere. I'm tired of running around." Parker left the series after the first 16 episodes, citing the limited nature of her role.

After 1969, she worked steadily, but except for a small role in Sunburn (1979), her onscreen acting was on television. Parker appeared in the NBC series Ghost Story episode "Half a Death" (1972). Parker appeared in  the TV movie Maybe I'll Come Home in the Spring (1971)  and on TV in  Home for the Holidays (1972). She starred in other TV movies and made guest appearances on series such as Hawaii Five-O, The Love Boat, Hotel, and Murder, She Wrote. Her final TV role was in the 1991 TV movie Dead on the Money.

Concurrent with her TV career, Parker starred in a number of theatrical productions, including the role of Margo Channing in Applause, the Broadway musical version of the film All About Eve. The role originally was played in the musical by Lauren Bacall. In 1976, she played Maxine in the Ahmanson Theater revival of The Night of the Iguana. She was replaced in the Circle in the Square Theatre revival of Pal Joey during previews.

For her contributions to the movie industry, Parker was honored with a star on the Hollywood Walk of Fame at 6340 Hollywood Boulevard.

Personal life
Parker was married four times:
 Fred Loseemarried in March 1943, divorced in 1944.
 Bert E. Friedlobmarried in 1946, divorced in 1953; the marriage produced three children.
 Paul Clemens, American portrait paintermarried in 1954, divorced in 1965; the marriage produced one child, actor Paul Clemens.
 Raymond N. Hirschmarried in 1966, widowed on September 14, 2001, when Hirsch died of esophageal cancer.

She was the grandmother of one-time child actor Chase Parker.

Parker was raised a Protestant, and later converted to Judaism, telling the New York Daily News columnist Kay Gardella in August 1969: "I think we're all Jews at heart...I wanted to convert for a long time." She later embraced Messianic Judaism, and was a supporter of Messianic Jewish philosopher, teacher, and commentator Roy Masters, owner of the Foundation of Human Understanding in Grants Pass, Oregon. In 1978, she wrote the foreword to Masters's book How Your Mind Can Keep You Well.

Parker, a life-long Democrat, endorsed Adlai Stevenson for president in the 1952 presidential election.

Death
Eleanor Parker died on December 9, 2013 at a medical facility in Palm Springs, California from complications of pneumonia. She was 91. Upon her death, she was cremated, and her ashes were buried at Forest Lawn Memorial Park, Hollywood Hills, Lot 3799, Eternal Love, the plot of her husband, Raymond Hirsch, who predeceased her in September 2001.

Filmography

Film and television

Theatre credits 
 Applause (1972)
 The Night of the Iguana (1976)Ahmanson Theatre
 Pal Joey (1976)replaced during previews

Radio appearances

Awards and nominations

References

Bibliography

External links 

 
 
 
 
 
 "Eleanor ParkerObituary", The Daily Telegraph online, 10 December 2013, accessed February 26, 2014.
 "TCM Remembers Eleanor Parker", Turner Classic Movies online, accessed February 26, 2014.
 Eleanor Parker photographs and literature
 Eleanor Parker at GlamourGirlsoftheSilverScreen.com
 Obituary at Los Angeles Times
 Obituary at The Guardian
 Obituary at Playbill
 Obituary at The Telegraph
 Obituary at Hollywood Reporter
 Obituary at New York Times
 Obituary at Variety

1922 births
2013 deaths
20th-century American actresses
Actresses from Ohio
American film actresses
American stage actresses
American television actresses
California Democrats
Converts to Judaism from Protestantism
Jewish American actresses
Metro-Goldwyn-Mayer contract players
Ohio Democrats
Paramount Pictures contract players
People from Cedarville, Ohio
People from East Cleveland, Ohio
Volpi Cup for Best Actress winners
Warner Bros. contract players
Western (genre) film actresses
Deaths from pneumonia in California
21st-century American Jews
21st-century American women
Burials at Forest Lawn Memorial Park (Hollywood Hills)